The 2002–03 NBA season was the Nuggets' 27th season in the National Basketball Association, and 36th season as a franchise. The Nuggets had the fifth overall pick in the 2002 NBA draft, and selected Nikoloz Tskitishvili from the Republic of Georgia. Prior to the start of the season, the Nuggets acquired Marcus Camby and top draft pick Nenê Hilario from the New York Knicks, acquired second-year guard Rodney White from the Detroit Pistons, and signed free agents Mark Blount and undrafted rookie Junior Harrington. After a 2–9 start to the season with new head coach Jeff Bzdelik, the Nuggets won three straight games, but then lost 15 of their next 16 games, which included a ten-game losing streak, as Camby only played just 29 games due to ankle and hip injuries. In December, James Posey was traded to the Houston Rockets in a three-team trade, while Blount was traded back to his former team, the Boston Celtics in exchange for Shammond Williams in February.

However, the team struggled posting a 14-game losing streak between February and March. They lost their final eight games finishing last place in the Midwest Division and in the league with 17 wins and 65 losses, the franchise's worst record since 1997–98. They also missed the playoffs for eight consecutive seasons. Juwan Howard led the team with 18.4 points and 7.6 rebounds per game, while Nenê averaged 10.5 points and 6.1 rebounds per game, and was selected to the NBA All-Rookie First Team. Following the season, Howard signed as a free agent with the Orlando Magic, and Williams, Harrington and Donnell Harvey were all released to free agency.

Draft picks

Roster

Roster Notes
 Point guard Shammond Williams holds American and Georgian dual citizenship. He played for the Georgian national team although he was born in the United States.

Regular season

Season standings

z - clinched division title
y - clinched division title
x - clinched playoff spot

Record vs. opponents

Game log

Player statistics

Regular season

Player Statistics Citation:

Awards and records
 Nenê, NBA All-Rookie Team 1st Team

Transactions

References

See also
 2002-03 NBA season

Denver Nuggets seasons
Denver Nuggets
Denver Nuggets
Denver Nug